Bhilangna Valley is located in the Himalayan region of India, along the Bhilangna River.

No surveys or studies dealing with the aspects such as distribution, abundance and ecology of mammals especially carnivores and their prey populations have been carried out. Unregulated anthropogenic activities probably influenced the habitat preference and response of wildlife therein. This emphasizes the need for the accounting and monitoring the carnivores and its prey in this area. Most of the previous studies in western Himalaya are carried out mostly within Protected Areas; Bhilangna Valley being a Reserve Forest area is accessible to the local and Gujjar communities for extractive uses and thus forms an impacted habitat for wildlife, particularly carnivores and their prey. Therefore, this study was important to provide baseline information on species distribution, anthropogenic pressure and species occupancy in different habitats of the valley. This information will be extremely useful to monitor the carnivores and their prey in the valley and to regulate the anthropogenic pressure in future.
Location and topography

The Bhilangna valley is situated in the Tehri district of Uttarakhand state lies between 30.3743N, 78.78055E to 30.88042N, 78.89864E having an area of 1009.24km2. This area falls under bio geographic zone 2B-Northwest Himalaya (Rodgers et al. 2000). Ridges of Vasuki-taal, Sahasra-taal and Masar taal surround this valley from east and west respectively. Similarly Khatling glacier and Tharti division lies in north and south respectively. 
Climate The Western Himalayan climate varies according to the elevation. It gets colder as the elevation increases and gets wetter as the elevation drops. As a result, the temperature and humidity changes in the Himalayan region very quickly. All of a sudden there can be occurrences of rain, floods, high winds, snowstorms and other types of precipitation. According to the paleo-climatologists, the Miocene led to drastic changes in the vegetation and the contemporary flora has been almost entirely replaced by modern flora (Vishnu-Mittre, 1972, Singh & Singh, 1987, 1992). Extending as an arc for about 2500 km from east to west, the Himalaya covers more than 10 degree of latitudes i.e. 270-380N and exhibits an interesting pattern of rainfall from west to east (increasing gradient) and south to north (decreasing gradient). Variation in the rainfall, mean annual temperature and altitude 0are considered key factors governing vegetation types in this region. The richness of the species in the Himalayan region is generally attributed to variation in climate and habitat types (Rau, 1975, Polunin & Stainton, 1984). In general, a rise of 270m in the hills corresponds to a fall of 10C in mean temperature up to 1500m, above which temperature fall is more rapid (Mani, 1974a). In the Himalayas the rate of temperature fall is more rapid in summer than in winter. There are many variations and complexities are in climate as well as complexities of weather accentuated by the relief of land. The variations of exposure to sunlight and to rain bearing winds have the effect of producing very intricate patterns of local climate. In summer months the valleys experience hot steamy tropical climate, while at a distance of about 75 km. the great range bears the highest snowfields of the world. Valley winds in narrow valleys and heavy fog during winter in wide valleys are conspicuous features of the region. The zone of maximum precipitation during both summer and winter lies between 1,200 and 2,100m (Nautiyal, 2011).

Vegetation The Western Himalaya of IHR is diverse in vegetation, probably because of climatic conditions and elevation variation. According to Champion & Seth (1968) nine forest types are found in Western Himalaya, as follows- 1. Ban Oak Forest 2. Moist Temperate Forest 3. Kharsu Oak Forest 4. Montane Bamboo Brakes 5. Himalayan Temperate Pastures 6. Sub-alpine Pastures 7. Birch/Rhododendron Scrub Forest 8. Deciduous Alpine Scrub 9. Alpine pastures

Fauna 

Since no wildlife related research ever done in Bhilangna valley before, so there is no accurate account about faunal diversity for this particular place meanwhile however the findings of the present study indicates that the faunal diversity of this site is probably as diverse as the rest of the western Himalaya. Broadly the six Mammalian orders which are present here are Primates, Carnivora, Artiodactyla, Rodentia, Lagomorpha and Chiroptera, including endangered and rare species such as Himalayan brown bear and Musk Deer.

Regarding Avifauna, a number of families are thought to occur ranging from Muscicapidae to Accipatridae with the exceptional variety of Galliforms attracting much attention. The area is also home to the usual assemblage of herpetofauna an entomofauna characteristic to the region (Personal observation).

References 

Valleys of Uttarakhand